Myrmecia athertonensis is an Australian ant which belongs to the genus Myrmecia. This species is native to Australia. They are commonly spotted in the north of Queensland. It was described by Forel in 1915.

The average lengths is around 14.6-22 millimetres long, and the males are 14.5-15.5 millimetres long. Most of the body of the species is black. The mandibles are however yellow, and the thorax is in a goldish-yellow colour.

References

External links

Myrmeciinae
Hymenoptera of Australia
Insects described in 1915
Insects of Australia